Roknia is a necropolis in the Guelma region of north-east Algeria consisting of more than 7000 dolmens spread over an area of 2 km.

See also 

 Megalith

Notes

External links 
 Dolmens of Roknia

Communes of Guelma Province
Archaeological sites in Algeria
Megalithic monuments
Cities in Algeria
Algeria